Tenny Wyss (10 April 1916 – 28 March 2001) was a Swiss swimmer. She competed in the women's 200 metre breaststroke at the 1936 Summer Olympics.

References

External links
 

1916 births
2001 deaths
Olympic swimmers of Switzerland
Swimmers at the 1936 Summer Olympics
Swiss female breaststroke swimmers
Sportspeople from Basel-Stadt
20th-century Swiss women